Jaime Alfonso Campos Quiroga (born 19 February 1953) is a Chilean lawyer and politician. He was minister during the governments of Ricardo Lagos (2000−2006) and Michelle Bachelet (2014−2018).

References

1953 births
Chilean people
University of Concepción alumni
Radical Social Democratic Party of Chile politicians
21st-century Chilean politicians
Living people